Southeast Conservative Baptists (more properly Southeast Conservative Baptist Association) is one of nine regional associations fellowshipping with the Conservative Baptist Association of America. This region consists of Alabama, South Carolina, Florida, Kentucky & Grand Bahama, and is a developing region outside of the geographical center of Conservative Baptists. The regional office is located in Kissimmee, Florida.

External links
Directory of Southeast Conservative Baptists

Further reading
Dictionary of Baptists in America, Bill J. Leonard, editor

Independent Baptist denominations in the United States
Organizations based in Florida